The Last Resort is a 5 issue limited-series from IDW Publishing by writers Justin Gray and Jimmy Palmiotti with art by Giancarlo Caracuzzo in 2009. The series was collected in a trade paperback in 2010.

Plot 
A planeful of passengers who have crash-landed on a tropical island on which a biological disaster has given rise to a deadly infestation.

Collected editions
Back To Brooklyn Volume 1 (120pages, paperback, March, 2010)

References

External links
Last Resort Interview at ComicBookResources
Jimmy Palmiotti Interview at Girls Read Comics
Jimmy Palmiotti talks about The Last Resort at Newsarama

Comic book limited series